Phu Khiao is a district (amphoe) in the northern part of Chaiyaphum province, northeastern Thailand.

History
Phu Khiao was a city (mueang) in the early years of the Rattanakosin Kingdom era at the end of the 18th century. The center of the city was in Ban Mueang Kao (which now is in Kaset Sombun district). The governor was Phraya Krai Singhanat. When the city grew, Phraya Krai Singhanat (Ruecha) moved the center of the city to Ban Kut Chueak. His son, the next governor Phraya Krai Singhanat (Bunma), was promoted by the government in Bangkok to be Phraya Phakdi Ruechai Changwang. Again he moved the city center to Ban Non Salao.

During the Thesaphiban administrative reforms Mueang Phu Khiao was downgraded to be a district of Chaiyaphum province in 1899.

It was later renamed Phak Pang after the central tambon, and changed back to Phu Khiao in 1939.

Geography
Neighboring districts are (from the north clockwise): Chum Phae of Khon Kaen province; Ban Thaen, Kaeng Khro, Kaset Sombun, and Khon San of Chaiyaphum Province.

Administration
The district is divided into 11 sub-districts (tambons).

References

External links
amphoe.com

Phu Khiao